The 1973 West Dorset District Council election was held on Thursday 10 May 1973 to elect councillors to the new West Dorset District Council in England. It took place on the same day as other district council elections in the United Kingdom.

These were the first elections to the new district council, which would come into effect on 1 April 1974. Future elections would take place every three years, with the next election scheduled for 6 May 1976.

The 1973 election saw Independent councillors take a significant majority on the Council.

Ward results

Beaminster

Bothenhampton

Bradford Abbas

Bradpole

Bridport

Broadmayne

Broadwindsor

Burton Bradstock

Caundle Vale

Cerne Valley

Charminster

Charmouth

Chesil Bank

Chickerell

Dorchester Central

Dorchester East

Dorchester West

Frome Valley

Halstock

Holnest

Loders

Lyme Regis

Maiden Newton

Netherbury

Owermoigne

Piddle Valley

Puddletown

Queen Thorne

Sherborne

Stinsford

Symondsbury

Thorncombe

Tolpuddle

Whitchurch Canonicorum

Winterborne St Martin

Yetminster

References

West Dorset
1973
20th century in Dorset